Scott Young (born 22 July 1969) is an English former footballer who played as a striker for Colchester United.

Career

Born in Shoreham-by-Sea, Young began his career with Colchester United, where he was a regular in the youth and reserve teams. He made just one appearance for the U's first-team, coming on as a substitute for Tony Adcock in a 4–2 away defeat to Aldershot in the Associate Members' Cup on 9 December 1986.

Young spent a portion of the 1987–88 season on loan to Wycombe Wanderers before signing permanently for a fee of £5,000. He left the club in October 1988, joining Bishop's Stortford. He then featured for a number of other non-league teams, including Witham Town, Wivenhoe Town, Brightlingsea United, Bury Town, Cornard United and Halstead Town.

References

1969 births
Living people
People from Shoreham-by-Sea
English footballers
Association football fullbacks
Colchester United F.C. players
Wycombe Wanderers F.C. players
Bishop's Stortford F.C. players
Witham Town F.C. players
Wivenhoe Town F.C. players
Brightlingsea Regent F.C. players
Bury Town F.C. players
Cornard United F.C. players
Halstead Town F.C. players